Roger Connor (1857–1931) was a Major League Baseball player.
Roger Connor may also refer to:
Roger Connor (judge) (born 1939), British judge
Roger G. Connor (1926–1999), justice of the Alaska Supreme Court

See also
Roger O'Connor (1762–1834), Irish nationalist and writer
Roger Connors (fl. 1980s–2000s), American management consultant and author